The 1996 Save Mart Supermarkets 300 was the tenth stock car race of the 1996 NASCAR Winston Cup Series, the fourth race of the 1996 NASCAR Winston West Series, and the eighth iteration of the event. The race was held on Sunday, May 5, 1996, in Sonoma, California, at the Grand Prix layout of Sears Point Raceway, a  permanent road course layout. The race took the scheduled 74 laps to complete. In the final laps of the race, Penske Racing South driver Rusty Wallace would manage to pull away on the final restart with six to go to take his 43rd career NASCAR Winston Cup Series victory and his second victory of the season. To fill out the top three, Roush Racing driver Mark Martin and Bud Moore Engineering driver Wally Dallenbach Jr. would finish second and third, respectively.

Background 

Sears Point Raceway is one of two road courses to hold NASCAR races, the other being Watkins Glen International. The Chute was only used for NASCAR events such as this race, and was criticized by many drivers, who preferred the full layout.

Entry list 

 (R) denotes rookie driver.

Qualifying 
Qualifying was split into two rounds. The first round was held on Friday, May 3, at 6:00 PM EST. Each driver would have one lap to set a time. During the first round, the top 25 drivers in the round would be guaranteed a starting spot in the race. If a driver was not able to guarantee a spot in the first round, they had the option to scrub their time from the first round and try and run a faster lap time in a second round qualifying run, held on Saturday, May 4, at 3:00 PM EST. As with the first round, each driver would have one lap to set a time. For this specific race, positions 26-38 would be decided on time, and four spots would be determined by NASCAR Winston Cup Series provisionals, while two more additional provisionals would be given to teams in the Winston West Series.

Seven drivers would fail to qualify: Geoff Bodine, Chad Little, Mark Krogh, Joe Bean, Wayne Jacks, Bill McAnally, and Lance Hooper.

Full qualifying results

Race results

References 

1996 NASCAR Winston Cup Series
NASCAR races at Sonoma Raceway
May 1996 sports events in the United States
1996 in sports in California